The 2003 Heineken Open was a men's tennis tournament played on outdoor hard courts at the ASB Tennis Centre in Auckland in New Zealand and was part of the International Series of the 2003 ATP Tour. It was the 36th edition of the tournament and was held from 6 January through 12 January 2003. Fourth-seeded Gustavo Kuerten won the singles title.

Finals

Singles

 Gustavo Kuerten defeated  Dominik Hrbatý 6–3, 7–5
 It was Kuerten's 1st title of the year and the 26th of his career.

Doubles

 David Adams /  Robbie Koenig defeated  Tomáš Cibulec /  Leoš Friedl 7–6(7–5), 3–6, 6–3
 It was Adams's only title of the year and the 19th of his career. It was Koenig's 1st title of the year and the 3rd of his career.

References

External links
 
 ATP – tournament profile
 ITF – tournament edition details
 Singles draw
 Doubles draw

 
Heineken Open
Heineken Open
ATP Auckland Open
January 2003 sports events in New Zealand